Oromia Bank (OB) is a private bank based in Addis Ababa, Ethiopia. It was established on 18 September 2008.

Overview
Oromia Bank S.C began operation on 25 October 2008 with a starting capital of 110 million birr (Br), surpassing the minimum capital requirement by 35 million Br. With its headquarters located in front of Dembel City Centre, near Getu Commercial Center in its own 13 story building on Africa Avenue (Bole Road). 

Established with the commercial banking business objectives, OIB is undertaking a universal commercial banking services such as deposit mobilization, lending of money, remittance service, and international banking services and interest free banking. The Bank has now launched Electronic banking systems such as Card banking known as Oro-Card (ATM and POS), Mobile Banking named as Oro-Cash, Agent Banking-Oro Agent and Internet banking namely Oro-Click. The number of OIB branches have now reached 225 throughout Ethiopia all connected by core banking system. The Bank is now one of the most influential and popular private banks in Ethiopia and also known for pioneering Interest free banking services.

References

External links

 

Banks of Ethiopia
Banks established in 2008
Oromia Region
Companies based in Addis Ababa
2008 establishments in Ethiopia